Lokshin, Lockshin is a Jewish surname. Notable people with the surname include:

 Aleksandr Lokshin (1920–1987), Russian composer of classical music
 Arnold Lockshin (born 1939), American-born Russian scientist
 Mikhail Lockshin (born 1981), American-born Russian film director
 Richard A. Lockshin (born 1937), American cell biologist
 Steve Lockshin

Jewish surnames